Khamsom is a village in Senapati district, Manipur, India. The predominant inhabitants belong to Poumai Naga tribe.

Cities and towns in Senapati district